is a railway station in Nobeoka, Miyazaki, Japan.

Lines

Layout 
The station consists of an island platform serving two tracks on a side hill cutting. There is no station building. From the access road, a short flight of steps leads to the station entrance from where a footbridge gives access to the island platform. A bike shed is provided near the footbridge and limited parking is available at the base of the step by the access road.

Adjacent stations

History
Japanese Government Railways (JGR) opened the station on 1 May 1949 as an additional station on the existing track of the Nippō Main Line. With the privatization of Japanese National Railways (JNR), the successor of JGR, on 1 April 1987, the station came under the control of JR Kyushu.

Passenger statistics
In fiscal 2016, the station was used by an average of 24 passengers (boarding only) per day.

See also
List of railway stations in Japan

References

External links 

Kitagawa (JR Kyushu)

Railway stations in Miyazaki Prefecture
Railway stations in Japan opened in 1949
Nobeoka, Miyazaki